René Lagrou (1904–1969) was a Belgian politician and collaborator with Nazi Germany.

Lagrou was born in Blankenberge in West Flanders, Belgium and worked as a lawyer in Antwerp. Lagrou had first came to prominence as a member of the Flemish National Union. He published his own journal Roeland, which became increasingly anti-Semitic following Adolf Hitler's rise to power. Following the German occupation of Belgium in World War II Lagrou, along with Ward Hermans, founded the extremist Algemeene-SS Vlaanderen (from 1942, the Germaansche SS in Vlaanderen), a Flemish political faction supported by the SS.

Lagrou saw action with the Waffen SS on the Eastern Front and some initial reports erroneously suggested that he had died in battle. However Lagrou had survived and he was captured by the Allies in France but managed to escape to Francoist Spain. In May 1946 his was one of three names on a 'black list' sent by the government of Belgium to Spain where he was in hiding, along with Léon Degrelle and Pierre Daye. Soon after he was condemned to death in absentia by the war crimes tribunal in Antwerp.

With the possibility of extradition from Spain looming, Lagrou arrived in Argentina in July 1947 and adopted the false name Reinaldo van Groede. Here he became a leading figure in the ratlines sponsored by Juan Perón to rescue Nazis from prosecution in Europe. Given wide powers within the immigration service in Argentina, Lagrou drew up ambitious plans to move as many as 2 million people from Belgium, all either Nazi collaborators or their families. He was also a member of the Rodolfo Freude-led División de Informaciones and in this capacity initiated the cases for resettlement for a number of Nazis.

References

20th-century Belgian criminals
1904 births
1969 deaths
Belgian emigrants to Argentina
Flemish lawyers
Belgian collaborators with Nazi Germany
Flemish politicians
Nazi propagandists
Belgian propagandists
Nazis in South America
People from West Flanders
Belgian people convicted of war crimes
Belgian prisoners sentenced to death
Prisoners sentenced to death by Belgium
People sentenced to death in absentia
Belgian Waffen-SS personnel